Beehive Medical Electronics, later known as Beehive International, was a manufacturer of computer display terminals.

History
The company was based in Salt Lake City, Utah and manufactured a variety of CRT display terminals in the 1970s and 1980s.

At its peak, Beehive employed 400 people. In 1980, the company opened a plant in Ireland.

The company filed for Chapter 11 bankruptcy reorganization in October 1984 and emerged from Chapter 11 in 1985.

Beehive outsourced production to Standard Elektrik Lorenz AG in West Germany in July, 1988. The company filed for Chapter 7 bankruptcy in November 1988 and the assets were auctioned off in January, 1989.

The terminal models included the ATL-008, MiniBee, the SuperBee and the B-100.  The B-100 was also provided to original equipment manufacturers for rebranding.  The Cromemco 3101 terminal is a rebranded B-100.

References

External links
 B-100 terminal
 Beehive Model I/II/III
 Mini Bee Computer Terminal Illustrated Parts Breakdown
 Mini Bee Computer Terminal Service Manual
 ATL-008 Technical User's Manual
 ATL-008 Maintenance Manual

Defunct manufacturing companies based in Utah